Rick White (1946 – 26 November 2004) was an Australian rock climber, best known for discovering and developing the rock climbing destination of Frog Buttress near Boonah in Queensland, Australia.

As climbing equipment was extremely hard to purchase in Australia around this time, Rick White founded Mountain Designs as a way to import gear from the United States.

White was the first person to solo Ball's Pyramid, and did so with a time of 1 hour and 45 minutes.

Rick White's mountaineering ascents included:

 1973 - First Australian ascent of El Capitan, Yosemite, USA.
 1974/5 - North face of Fitzroy, Patagonia with Rob Staszewski.
 1979 - Andes, Patagonia with Greg Child, Paul Edwards, Ken Joyce.
 1982 - Shivling, India with Greg Child, George Bettemburg (FR), Doug Scott (UK).
 1985 - Mustagh Ata with Steve McDowell.

In his later years, White developed a muscular disease that prevented him from climbing. With a lasting passion for the sport, he remained active in the climbing scene for many years, mentoring a number of young competitive climbers including Cass Crane, Peter Crane, Thomas Farrell and Libby Hall.

He died in Winchester Hospital in the United Kingdom from cancer; his ashes were scattered from the top of the first route he did at Frog Buttress, 'Corner of Eden'.

References

External links
 Rick White Foundation

Australian rock climbers
Australian mountain climbers
1946 births
2004 deaths